Scamp may refer to:

Computers and engineering
 National Semiconductor SC/MP (pronounced Scamp), an early 8 bit microprocessor
 Single-Channel Antijam Man-Portable Terminal, part of the Advanced Extremely High Frequency system
 Single-Chip A-series Mainframe Processor, a single-chip implementation of the Burroughs large systems computer architecture
 Special Computer APL Machine Portable, a prototype name for a single-user, portable computer concept made by IBM Research in 1973
 Standardised Compatible Audio Modular Package, an audio processor range from Audio & Design (Recording) Ltd

Military
 SS Sea Scamp, a 1943 Type C3 ship S-A2 troop transport in World War II
 SS-14 Scamp, the NATO reporting name for the RT-15 theatre ballistic missile of the Soviet Union
 USS Scamp, several ships
 USS Scamp (SS-277), a Gato class submarine (1942–1945)
 USS Scamp (SSN-588), a Skipjack class submarine (1961–1988)

Transportation
 Aerosport Scamp, a small biplane designed for home building
 Clark Scamp, a simple, bicycle-based moped
 Honda Scamp, a.k.a. Honda N360, car made 1967–1970
 Mini Scamp, a kit car based on the Mini
 Plymouth Scamp (disambiguation), either of two small vehicles from Plymouth
 SCAMP (boat) or Small Craft Advisor Magazine Project, a wooden or fiberglass hulled sailing dinghy
 Scottish Aviation Scamp, prototype electric microcar produced by Scottish Aviation
 Southern Aeronautical Scamp, an American aircraft designed for home construction and Formula V Air Racing
 Supersonic Cruise and Maneuvering Program, the initial name for the General Dynamics F-16XL prototype aircraft

Other uses
 The Scamp, a 1957 British drama film
 Scamp (comics), a Disney cartoon puppy from Lady and the Tramp
 Scamp grouper (Mycteroperca phenax), a grouper fish
 Colt SCAMP or small caliber machine pistol, conceived in 1969 as a replacement to the aging Colt M1911A1 pistol
 Supercritical Air Mobility Pack, breathing set in diving

People with the surname
 William Scamp (1801–1872), English architect and engineer